The Sierra Aguilada is a mountain range in southwest Catron County, New Mexico on the eastern perimeter of Arizona's White Mountains. The Mogollon Mountains of New Mexico lie just east, with a south-flowing section of the San Francisco River separating them. The river then turns west, forming the southern border of the Sierra Aguilada, and continues to eventually intercept the Gila River after traversing northwest of the Big Lue Mountains of Arizona.

Geography
The Sierra Aguilada is about 15 mi long. It is in a region of mountainous forest and mesas. The Mogollon Mountains are east, with the large Gila Wilderness and Gila National Forest. To the north and northwest lies the Blue Range Wilderness.

The east perimeter of the range is traversed by U.S. Route 180 in New Mexico as it parallels a north-south section of the San Francisco River. The communities of Pleasanton and Glenwood lie on the east and northeast of the range along the San Francisco River.

Peaks
The highest peak in the range, Brushy Mountain, is in the north center of the range and east of the range centerline; Park Mountain, is adjacent, and just west of the range centerline.

References

Landforms of Catron County, New Mexico
Mountain ranges of New Mexico